Warhammer Quest is a series of three tactical role-playing video games developed and published by Rodeo Games and Perchang Games. The first game, Warhammer Quest, was released in 2013. The second game, Warhammer Quest 2: The End Times, was released in 2017. Warhammer Quest: Silver Tower, was released in 2020. The first two games are based on Games Workshop's 1995 board game Warhammer Quest, which itself is based on the tabletop wargame Warhammer. Silver Tower is based on the 2016 sequel board game of the same name.

Gameplay
Warhammer Quest is a top-down turn-based dungeon crawler. The player controls a party of four warriors in search of treasure in the dungeons of The Old World. The dungeons are randomly generated.

Warhammer Quest 2 is set years after the events of the first game during Chaos' final assault on the Old World. Warhammer Quest 2 has full 3D polygonal graphics compared to the 2D top-down graphics of the first game.

In Silver Tower, the party has to find eight fragments of a Chaos Amulet hidden in the titular dungeon and deal with the master of the tower, the Gaunt Summoner, and his minions. Silver Tower is a free-to-play gacha game where the player is enticed to spend money to buy lootboxes and random heroes. A multiplayer mode was added to the game on September 15, 2022.

Release
Warhammer Quest series was developed by Rodeo Games and Perchang Games, studios that are both based in Guildford, England. Warhammer Quest was announced on August 21, 2012, for release in spring 2013. The game was showcased at UK Games Expo 2012. The iOS version was released on May 30, 2013. It uses Taurus game engine, the same engine from Rodeo's previous game, Hunters 2. An expansion, The Brutal Tribe, was released on October 3, 2013. Another expansion, The Undead Horde, was released in December 2013. PC, Linux and Mac versions were announced on December 15, 2014, for release on January 7, 2015. Android version was released on June 26, 2015. PlayStation 4 and Xbox One versions were released in 2017, Nintendo Switch version was released in 2019.

In July 2017, Warhammer Quest 2 was announced to be released in September 2017. The game was released eventually on October 19, 2017. Android version was released on April 11, 2018. The PC and Mac versions were released on January 30, 2019. Xbox One and Nintendo Switch versions were released in 2019, PlayStation 4 version was released in 2020.

Silver Tower was released for Android and iOS on September 3, 2020. It was released for PC on June 3, 2021.

Reception

Warhammer Quest
According to the review aggregate website Metacritic, the iOS version of Warhammer Quest received "generally favorable reviews", while the PC version received "mixed or average reviews".

Dan Whitehead of Eurogamer summarized: "With its moreish pace and compelling presentation there's the basis of a really great tablet RPG here, but Warhammer Quest makes two misguided assumptions that hold it back. It assumes that role-playing works better with all the dice and messy statistics brushed off the table, and it assumes that a multiplayer board game and a single-player video game are the same experience."

Brad Cummings of TouchArcade summarized: "Warhammer Quest, while being an excellent port of a classic board game, is actually an amazing dungeon crawler on iOS, no matter what your experience with the source material. You owe it to yourself to check out this excellent hack and slash experience."

Mike Futter of Game Informer summarized: "Put simply, this is an excellent mobile translation of a tabletop experience – but random design elements in the source material hold it back."

Stace Harman of Eurogamer reviewed the PC version and said: "Warhammer Quest is a competent example of a digital board game but in trying to sand its sharp edges and ensure that it's accessible to all, Rodeo has oversimplified the already slight source material."

Adam Smith of Rock Paper Shotgun said: "Its problems include a stack of day one DLC, an in-game gold shop and an interface that hasn't made the transition from touchscreen quite as smoothly as you might hope. Despite all of that, it's simple turn-based tactical combat is weirdly compelling and sundering skaven and snotlings can be a fine way to while away a few lazy evenings."

PC Gamer listed the game seventh on its list of best Warhammer Fantasy games.

Warhammer Quest 2: The End Times
Warhammer Quest 2: The End Times received "mixed or average" reviews according to review aggregator Metacritic.

Harry Slater of Pocket Gamer said: "Warhammer Quest 2 builds on the successes of its predecessor. It feels more like a game in its own right though, less tethered to the board games that inspired it. And that can only be a good thing as far as I'm concerned."

Matt Thrower of Pocket Tactics summarized: "Warhammer Quest 2: The End Times is a flashy but simplified successor to the original. It feels less like a board game than the first game and more like a game tailor-made for the digital medium. Unfortunately, a sense of challenge and tension has been lost along the way."

Jason Rodriguez of PC Invasion reviewing the PC version said: "Unfortunately, a number of issues from RNG mechanics to monotonous dungeon runs mar what could’ve been an amazing experience. It might be stellar on mobiles and tablets owing to shorter bursts of playing time. Sadly, as a PC title — where it’s common for strategy game playthroughs to last several hours per sitting — it needs more than just a retouch."

Warhammer Quest: Silver Tower
Sean Martin of Pocket Tactics gave the game eight out of ten and summarized: "Though its champion system could use a little work, Warhammer Quest: Silver Tower is an excellent turn-based strategy game with plenty of potential".

Tommaso Pugliese of Multiplayer.it gave the game 7.0 out of 10 and said: "Warhammer Quest: Silver Tower is a solid turn-based strategy game with nice environments and characters, but it doesn't represent the evolution that we expected to see from the third chapter of the series."

References

External links
Official website for Warhammer Quest
Official website for Warhammer Quest 2: The End Times
Official website for Warhammer Quest: Silver Tower

2013 video games
2017 video games
2020 video games
Android (operating system) games
Free-to-play video games
IOS games
Linux games
MacOS games
Multiplayer and single-player video games
Multiplayer online games
Nintendo Switch games
PlayStation 4 games
Rodeo Games games
Single-player video games
Tactical role-playing video games
Top-down video games
Video game franchises introduced in 2013
Video games based on board games
Video games developed in the United Kingdom
Video games with downloadable content
Video games with expansion packs
Quest
Windows games
Xbox One games